Rifleman John Beeley VC (8 February 1918 – 21 November 1941) was a British Army soldier and an English recipient of the Victoria Cross (VC), the highest and most prestigious award for gallantry in the face of the enemy that can be awarded to British and Commonwealth forces.

Beeley was 23 years old, and a rifleman in the 1st Battalion, King's Royal Rifle Corps, British Army during Operation Crusader in the Second World War when the following deed took place for which he was awarded the VC.

On 21 November 1941 at Sidi Rezegh, Libya, at an airfield being attacked by Rifleman Beeley's company, progress was held up by short range fire. All the officers of the company were wounded so, on his own initiative the rifleman ran forward over open ground, firing his Bren gun and at 20 yards range put an anti-tank gun and two machine-guns out of action. He was killed but his bravery inspired his comrades to further efforts to reach their objective, which was eventually captured, together with 700 prisoners.

He is buried in the Knightsbridge War Cemetery, Acroma, Libya. His Victoria Cross is displayed at the Royal Green Jackets (Rifles) Museum in Winchester, England. A street in Openshaw, Manchester, has been named John Beeley Avenue in his honour.

References
Citations

Bibliography
British VCs of World War 2 (John Laffin, 1997)
Monuments to Courage (David Harvey, 1999)
The Register of the Victoria Cross (This England, 1997)

External links

KRRC journal

1918 births
1941 deaths
People from Openshaw
British World War II recipients of the Victoria Cross
King's Royal Rifle Corps soldiers
British Army personnel killed in World War II
British Army recipients of the Victoria Cross
Burials at Knightsbridge War Cemetery
Military personnel from Manchester